Gunour is a town and tehsil located in the Panna district, within the Madhya Pradesh state in central India.

References

Cities and towns in Panna district